Effasu (or Effasu-Mangyea) is a farming community in the Jomoro District in the Western Region of Ghana, about 150 km west of Takoradi. The Osagyefo Barge is located at Effasu.

References

Populated places in Jomoro Municipal District